Trail of Tears is the fourth studio album from country artist Billy Ray Cyrus. It was released on August 20, 1996, and two singles were released: the title track and "Three Little Words", which respectively peaked at number 69 and number 65 on the country charts. Also included is a cover of Jeannie C. Riley's "Harper Valley PTA".

The album debuted at number 125 on the U.S. Billboard 200, and at number 20 on the U.S. Top Country Albums. The album has sold more than 250,000 copies worldwide. Despite low sales the album was the first to receive widespread critical acclaim from music critics for Cyrus, earning him industry respect from Nashville.

Critical reception

AllMusic's Thom Owens called it Cyrus' "most personal and [most] accomplished album", pointing out the "rootsy production flourishes" that added grit and edge to the overall sound and Cyrus having more conviction in his delivery, concluding that: "In fact, Trail of Tears suggests that he may be able to carve out a successful career for himself, after all." Alanna Nash of Entertainment Weekly called it "a rapidly maturing, bleeding-heart blend of roots rock and country classics wrapped in bare-bones production." She added that "Need a Little Help" and the title track had the potential to turn Cyrus into an "artistic contender".

Track listing

Personnel
Credits adapted from the Trail of Tears media notes.
Sly Dog
 Billy Ray Cyrus – lead vocals, background vocals, acoustic guitar
 Greg Fletcher – drums
 Corky Holbrook – bass guitar
 Michael J. Sagraves – dobro, acoustic guitar, electric guitar, steel guitar, harmonica, mandolin, slide guitar
 Terry Shelton – drums, 12-string guitar, acoustic guitar, electric guitar, keyboards, percussion
 Barton Stevens – keyboards, background vocals

Additional Musicians
 Ava Aldridge – background vocals
 Jeff E. Cox – bass guitar
 Mark Douthit – saxophone
 John Griffiths – background vocals
 Lee Hendricks – bass guitar
 Wanda Vick – fiddle
 Don Von Tress – acoustic guitar, electric guitar, bass guitar, mandolin, background vocals
 Bob Workman – bass guitar

Production
 Billy Ray Cyrus – co-producer
 Terry Shelton – co-producer, mixing
 John Jaszcz – mixing
 Chuck Linder – assistant engineer
 Michael Joe Sagraves – assistant engineer
 Hank Williams – mastering

Chart performance

Album

Singles

References

1996 albums
Billy Ray Cyrus albums
Mercury Nashville albums